The Girl from Chickasaw County: The Complete Capitol Masters is an 8-disc box set compilation album by singer-songwriter Bobbie Gentry. It was released on September 21, 2018, by Capitol and UMe. It features Gentry’s entire recording career with Capitol Records, bringing together 7 studio albums, 75 previously unreleased tracks, including demos, alternate takes and live recordings from Gentry's BBC television series.

Background
Announced on July 27, 2018, Gentry’s 76th birthday, the album includes Gentry’s six solo albums, her collaboration album with Glen Campbell as well as over 70 previously unreleased recordings, including live recordings from Gentry’s 1968-1971 BBC series. The release has specially commissioned cover art by David Downton, and contains an 84-page book, eight postcards and a copy of Gentry’s original handwritten lyrics to her iconic hit, “Ode to Billie Joe”. The set was compiled by Andrew Batt who produced the unreleased material and wrote the essay included in the book.

Track listing

 Tracks 1–10 from Ode to Billie Joe (1967).
 Tracks 11–17 previously unreleased.
 Track 18 released in mono on Ode to Bobbie Gentry: The Capitol Years (2000).
 Tracks 19–20 from Capitol single QCL 197 (1968).

 Tracks 1–12 from The Delta Sweete (1968).
 Tracks 13–24 previously unreleased.
 Note: The dates listed with tracks 23 and 24 are episode airdates, not recording dates.

 Tracks 1–11 from Local Gentry (1968).
 Track 12 from Capitol single 2295 (1968).
 Track 13 from Ode to Bobbie Gentry: The Capitol Years (2000).
 Tracks 14–17 previously unreleased.

 Tracks 1–11 from Bobbie Gentry and Glen Campbell (1968).
 Tracks 12–13 from Capitol single 2745 (1970).
 Tracks 14–16 previously unreleased.
 Track 17 from Kelly Gordon's album Defunked (1969).
 Track 18 from Capitol single CR 2232 (1969).
 Tracks 19–20 from Capitol single 006-80.328 (1970).

 Tracks 1–10 from Touch 'Em with Love (1969). Track 9 also appeared on Fancy.
 Tracks 11–20, 22 previously unreleased.
 Track 21 from Ode to Bobbie Gentry: The Capitol Years (2000).
 Track 23 from The Best of the Capitol Years (2007).

 Tracks 1–9 from Fancy (1970).
 Track 10 from I'll Never Fall in Love Again (1970).
 Tracks 11, 15–20 previously unreleased.
 Track 12 from Capitol single 2849 (1970).
 Track 13–14 from The Christmas Sound of Music (1969).
Note: The date listed with track 20 is the episode airdate, not recording date.

 Tracks 1–19 from Patchwork (1971). Track 5 also appeared on I'll Never Fall in Love Again (1970).
 Track 20 from The Best of the Capitol Years (2007).
 Tracks 21, 23–25 previously unreleased.
 Track 22 from 20 Years: Bear Family Records, 1975—1995 (1995).
 Tracks 26–27 from Capitol single 3413 (1972).

 Tracks 1–3, 5, 6, 9–11, 13–16 from Live at the BBC (2018).
 Tracks 4, 7, 8, 12, 17–26 previously unreleased.
Note: The dates listed with each track on this disc are episode airdates, not recording dates.

Charts

Release history

References

Bobbie Gentry albums
2018 compilation albums